Defending champions Serena and Venus Williams defeated Cara Black and Liezel Huber in the final, 6–4, 6–3 to win the women's doubles tennis title at the 2010 Australian Open. It was the Williams sisters' fourth Australian Open doubles title together, and eleventh major title together overall. It was also the third component of an eventual non-calendar-year Grand Slam.

Seeds

Draw

Finals

Top half

Section 1

Section 2

Bottom half

Section 3

Section 4
{{16TeamBracket-Compact-Tennis3
| RD1=First round
| RD2=Second round
| RD3=Third round
| RD4=Quarterfinals

| RD1-seed01=8
| RD1-team01=
| RD1-score01-1=6
| RD1-score01-2=6
| RD1-score01-3= 
| RD1-seed02= 
| RD1-team02= K Flipkens M Oudin
| RD1-score02-1=3
| RD1-score02-2=2
| RD1-score02-3= 

| RD1-seed03= 
| RD1-team03= J Janković S Perry
| RD1-score03-1=6
| RD1-score03-2=6
| RD1-score03-3= 
| RD1-seed04= 
| RD1-team04= D Cibulková M Krajicek
| RD1-score04-1=1
| RD1-score04-2=4
| RD1-score04-3= 

| RD1-seed05= 
| RD1-team05= M Kondratieva A Sevastova
| RD1-score05-1=5
| RD1-score05-2=6
| RD1-score05-3=2
| RD1-seed06= 
| RD1-team06= V Razzano Y Wickmayer
| RD1-score06-1=7
| RD1-score06-2=3
| RD1-score06-3=6

| RD1-seed07= 
| RD1-team07= A Cornet S Fichman
| RD1-score07-1=5
| RD1-score07-2=3
| RD1-score07-3= 
| RD1-seed08=9
| RD1-team08= E Vesnina J Zheng
| RD1-score08-1=7
| RD1-score08-2=6
| RD1-score08-3= 

| RD1-seed09=16
| RD1-team09=

External links
 2010 Australian Open – Women's draws and results at the International Tennis Federation

Women's Doubles
Australian Open (tennis) by year – Women's doubles
2010 in Australian women's sport